Biratnagar Airport  is a domestic airport located in Biratnagar serving Morang District, Province No. 1, Nepal. Biratnagar Airport is the third busiest airport in Nepal after Kathmandu and Pokhara. There are plans to upgrade the airport to serve international flights very soon.

History

Biratnagar Airport commenced operations on 6 July 1958.

On 15 August 2017, during the August 2017 Nepal and India floods the runway of Biratnagar Airport was flooded, along with other parts of India and Nepal, and the airport was forced to suspend its operations.

In 2019, the Civil Aviation Authority of Nepal decided to upgrade the Biratnagar Airport to an international level, which includes lengthening the runway. In 2022, locals demonstrated, as they still were not compensated for the land that the Government was purchasing to expand the airport area.

Facilities 
The airport is one of the few airports in Nepal that has its own aviation fuel depot on site, enabling aircraft to refuel here during turnover periods.

Airlines and destinations

Statistics

Accidents and incidents
10 June 1973(2030 jestha 28) – 1973 Nepal plane hijack: A Royal Nepal Airlines flight from Biratnagar to Kathmandu, operated by a de Havilland Canada DHC-6 Twin Otter (9N-ABB), was taken over by three hijackers of the Nepali Congress party who demanded money and escaped after landing in Bihar, India. None of the three crew and 18 passengers were injured.
18 November 1981, a Pilatus PC-6 (Porter & Turbo Porter) of Royal Nepal Airlines cashed after initial climb after it lost height. The fatalities included 1 crew and 9 passengers.
 In October 2021, the airport closed for four days due to flooding of runway by torrential rainfall.

See also
List of airports in Nepal

References

External links
 

Airports in Nepal
Koshi Province
Buildings and structures in Morang District
Biratnagar
1958 establishments in Nepal